Adnan Mehmood (born 1 July 1993) is a Pakistani cricketer. He made his first-class debut for Rawalpindi in the 2013–14 Quaid-e-Azam Trophy on 10 January 2014.

References

External links
 

1993 births
Living people
Pakistani cricketers
Place of birth missing (living people)
Pakistan Television cricketers
Rawalpindi cricketers